The 74th Guards Motor Rifle Brigade is a military formation of the Russian Ground Forces's 41st Combined Arms Army, part of the Central Military District, stationed in Yurga, Kemerovo Oblast, Russia.

History

Early years and WWII 
The 74th Motor Rifle Brigade was created from the disbanded 94th Guards Zvenigorod-Berlin Order of Suvorov Motor Rifle Division, formerly of the Group of Soviet Forces in Germany. The 94th Guards Rifle Division was formed on 23 April 1943 in the eastern Ukraine with the consolidation of the 14th Guards and 96th Rifle Brigades. It took part in the liberation of southern Ukraine through the remainder of 1943 and into 1944 as part of the 5th Shock Army. It remained with the Army through the remainder of the war and ended in the streets of Berlin. Post-war, it remained with the 5th Shock Army for a period, then transferred to the 3rd Army. In 1957, it was one of the few Rifle Divisions to be reorganized into a Motor Rifle Division and still retain its original number. In the mid-1980s, it was transferred to the 2nd Guards Tank Army, where it remained until withdrawn from East Germany in 1991.
After arriving in Yurga (near Tomsk) in the Siberian Military District, it was reorganized into the 74th Guards Motor Rifle Brigade, where it remains today. Other units also became part of the 74th Guards Motor Rifle Brigade including a guards engineering battalion and the 386th Tank Regiment.

On February 3, 2005, Russian defense minister Sergei Ivanov visited the brigade and promised that by the end of 2006, the brigade would consist fully of professional soldiers, not conscripts. He also said the brigade was one of the most combat ready of the entire Russian military, and promised the construction of a new barracks.

As of 2005, the commander was Major General Farid Balaliyev.

War in Chechnya 
By 30 December 1994, the brigade was in Chechnya in reserve, sending 3000+ personnel, 45 tanks, 115 BMP-1s to the fight. The brigade fought in street fights in Groznyy. According to records, the brigade lost 120+ personnel during the war.

Russian intervention in the Syrian Civil War 
Elements of the brigade are participating in the Russian military intervention in the Syrian Civil War.

2022 invasion of Ukraine 
The brigade is involved in the 2022 Russian invasion of Ukraine. The Ukrainian Ambassador to the United States Oksana Markarova claimed that a platoon of the 74th Motor Rifle Brigade had surrendered to Ukrainian forces near Chernihiv. The platoon's personnel were unaware they were "brought to Ukraine to kill Ukrainians" and refused to fight although Russia later denied that any such situation ever took place.

On 8 March, the brigade conducted a river crossing of the Desna River in Chernihiv Oblast without setback.

Elements of the brigade were among the units that attempted to cross the Siverskyi Donets River, near Bilohorivka, between May 8th and 10th, in the Battle of Siverskyi Donets; reportedly losing over 485 out of 550 men, and perhaps up to 1,500 of 2,000, and 80 vehicles. The Institute for the Study of War noted that despite their previous successful river crossing, the brigade's commanders may have underestimated improved Ukrainian artillery capability or may have been unable to control troop movements during the crossing.

Units, 1989-90
Assigned units:
Division Headquarters – Schwerin 53° 37’ 00” North, 11° 25’ 00” East
204th Guards Motor Rifle Regiment (BMP) – Schwerin 53° 36’ 10” North, 11° 25’ 20” East
286th Guards Motor Rifle Regiment (BTR) – Schwerin 53° 35’ 40” North, 11° 26’ 00” East
288th Guards Motor Rifle Regiment (BTR) – Wismar 53° 53’ 30” North, 11° 26’ 00” East
74th Guards Tank Regiment – Schwerin 53° 36’ 20” North, 11° 25’ 20” East
199th Guards Self-Artillery Regiment – Wismar 53° 53’ 30” North, 11° 26’ 00” East
896th Anti-Aircraft Missile Regiment – Schwerin 53° 36’ 50” North, 11° 22’ 30” East
28th Separate Tank Battalion – Schwerin 53° 36’ 50” North, 11° 22’ 30” East
496th Separate Anti-Tank Artillery Battalion – Schwerin 53° 38’ 40” North, 11° 25’ 30” East
12th Separate Reconnaissance & Radio EW Battalion – Schwerin 53° 34’ 40” North, 11° 26’ 30” East
159th Separate Guards Signals Battalion – Schwerin 53° 37’ 00” North, 11° 25’ 00” East
107th Separate Guards Engineer-Sapper Battalion – Schwerin 53° 35’ 40” North, 11° 26’ 00” East
Unidentified Independent Chemical Defense Battalion
52nd Separate Repair-Reconstruction Battalion
90th Separate Medical-Sanitation Battalion
1130th Separate Material Support Battalion

Contemporary formation

Brigade units include:
HQ 74th Independent Motor Rifle Brigade - Yurga
867th Separate Motor-Rifle Battalion
873rd Separate Motor-Rifle Battalion
880th Separate Motor-Rifle Battalion
13th Separate Tank Battalion
227th Separate Self-Propelled Howitzer artillery Battalion
230th Separate Self-Propelled Howitzer artillery Battalion
237th Separate Anti-Tank Artillery Battalion
243rd Separate Anti-Aircraft Rocket-Artillery Battalion
Total: 3000 troops

References 

Craig Crofoot, Group of Soviet Forces Germany, Version 3.0.0, manuscript available at www.microarmormayhem.com
GlobalSecurity.org, 74th Brigade
94th Guards Rifle Division (Russian)

074G
Military units and formations established in 1992